Trimethylsilyl trifluoromethanesulfonate is a trifluoromethanesulfonate derivate with a trimethylsilyl R-group. It has similar reactivity to trimethylsilyl chloride, and is also used often in organic synthesis.

Illustrative reactions 
A common application is the conversion of ketones and aldehydes to silyl enol ethers.

The stereoselective synthesis of seven benzylated proanthocyanidin trimers (epicatechin-(4β-8)-epicatechin-(4β-8)-epicatechin trimer (procyanidin C1), catechin-(4α-8)-catechin-(4α-8)-catechin trimer (procyanidin C2), epicatechin-(4β-8)-epicatechin-(4β-8)-catechin trimer and epicatechin-(4β-8)-catechin-(4α-8)-epicatechin trimer derivatives) can be achieved with TMSOTf-catalyzed condensation reaction, in excellent yields. Deprotection of (+)-catechin and (−)-epicatechin trimers derivatives gives four natural procyanidin trimers in good yields.

It has been used in Takahashi Taxol total synthesis or for chemical glycosylation reactions.

Trimethylsilyl trifluoromethanesulfonate is used to install tert-alkyl groups on phosphine (R = alkyl):
PH3  +  R3C–OAc  +  Me3SiOTf  →  [(R3C)2PH2]OTf

Related reagents
Trimethylsilyl trifluoromethanesulfonate is a source of trimethylsilyl cation.  Other more potent sources silylium cations are known.

See also 
 Silyl enol ether

References 

Trimethylsilyl compounds
Triflate esters